Beverly Grant may refer to:
 Beverly Grant (athlete)
 Beverly Grant (actress)